Party of Peace and Unity (PME; ; Partiya mira i yedinstva, PME) is a political party in Russia.

It was founded in 1996, uniting several communist groups that opposed president Yeltsin's policies. Its leader was Sazhi Umalatova, a Russian politician of Chechen nationality, who was a devoted opponent of Mikhail Gorbachev and Boris Yeltsin. Umalatova supported the August coup in 1991 and the anti-Yeltsin opposition in the October 1993 events. However, she later became an ardent supporter of President Vladimir Putin.

At the December 7, 2003 legislative elections, the party won 0.25% of the popular vote and no seats. The party did not participate in the 2007 legislative election and merged with the party Patriots of Russia in 2008.

The party received 34 million barrels worth of oil vouchers in the United Nations Oil-for-Food Programme, according to the paper "The Beneficiaries of Saddam's Oil Vouchers: The List of 270".

The party was revived on May 24, 2012

References

1996 establishments in Russia
2008 disestablishments in Russia
2012 establishments in Russia
Anti-Americanism
Eurasianism
Nationalist parties in Russia
Political parties disestablished in 2008
Political parties established in 1996
Political parties established in 2012